The 1925 Duquesne Dukes football team represented Duquesne University during the 1925 college football season. The head coach was Frank McDermott, coaching his first season with the Dukes.

Schedule

References

Duquesne
Duquesne Dukes football seasons
College football winless seasons
Duquesne Dukes football